Halcyonair, S.A. was an airline with its head office in Amílcar Cabral International Airport in Espargos, Sal, Cape Verde. It was established in April 2005 and operated domestic flights between the Cape Verde Islands from its main base Amílcar Cabral International Airport.

Destinations
Cape Verde
Boa Vista - Rabil Airport
Maio - Maio Airport
Praia - Praia International Airport
Sal - Amílcar Cabral International Airport Hub
São Filipe - São Filipe Airport
São Nicolau - Preguiça Airport
São Vicente - São Pedro Airport

Fleet
The Halcyonair fleet included the following aircraft (as of June 2013):

References

External links

Halcyonair Fleet

Defunct airlines of Cape Verde
Airlines established in 2005
Airlines disestablished in 2013
2005 establishments in Cape Verde
2013 disestablishments in Cape Verde
Espargos